Comedy Classes is an Indian comedy show on channel Life OK. Produced by Optimystix Entertainment, its starting date was 7 October 2014. 
The show is set in the Ache Din Institute an acting school run by Selfie Mausi and her brother Naseer. This series is about to be returned on Star Bharat in the month of August, 2021.

Seasons

Initially a sitcom, the show converted into a spoofs-based show. It starred Krushna Abhishek, Sudesh Lehri, Bharti Singh, Madhura Naik, Shakeel Siddiqui, Mubeen Saudagar, Siddharth Sagar,  Subuhi Joshi, Bruna Abdullah, and Shraman Jain in the first season.

The second season started on 12 May 2015. Siddharth Sagar as 'Selfie Mausi' hosted skits performed by various comedians.
The cast included Krushna Abhishek, Bharti Singh, Siddharth Sagar, Mubeen Saudagar, Shakeel Siddiqui, Bruna Abdullah, and Subuhi Joshi.

The third season Comedy Classes added Archana Puran Singh as judge named 'Maafia Mausi'. Show was made more interactive with live audience. The cast members were Siddharth Sagar, Mubeen Saudagar, Siddharth Jadhav, Sugandha Mishra, Rauf Lala, Shakeel Siddiqui, Subuhi Joshi, Sayantani Ghosh, Arti Singh, Purbi Joshi, and Balraj.

In the fourth season, the show was made biweekly. The show format was changed into making spoofs of Bollywood blockbuster movies enacted by its Cast Siddharth Sagar, Mubeen Saudagar, Gaurav Khanna, Siddharth Jadhav, Purbi Joshi, Balraj and Arti Singh, and Shakeel Siddiqui.

The fifth season Comedy Classes Evolution. The cast members were Siddharth Sagar, Mubeen Saudagar, Siddharth Jadhav, Sugandha Mishra, Sanket Bhosale, Sudesh Lehri, Devoleena Bhattacharjee, Sunil Grover, Upasana Singh, Shakeel Siddiqui, Ali Asgar, Sumona Chakravorty, Kapil Sharma and Balraj.

Special appearance
Saif Ali Khan & Ileana D'Cruz to promote their film Happy Ending
Adil Hussain & Mona Singh to promote their film Zed Plus
Rakhi Sawant - Guest Appearance (2015 & 2016)
Ganesh Acharya to promote their his film Hey Bro
Rahul Mahajan & Dimpy Mahajan (2015) - Bigg Boss contestants (spoof)
Geeta Kapoor (2015) - Guest Appearance in (spoof of Jhalak Dikhhla Jaa)
Devoleena Bhattacharjee as Gopi Bahu (spoof of Saath Nibhaana Saathiya
Sara Khan (2015) - Guest appearance as Sadhna Bahu (Spoof of Sapna Babul Ka...Bidaai) & (2016) - Dance Performance on Republic Day
Vishal Singh As Nawab & Guest appearance in New Year Special (2015)
Sidharth Shukla, Savio Barnes, Sayantani Ghosh, Aishwarya Sakhuja (2015) - Guest Appearance as contestant in Dance Baliye! (Spoof of Nach Baliye)
Emraan Hashmi & Amyra Dastur to promote their film Mr. X (2015)
Apara Mehta - (2015) Guest appearance as Judge of Miss Mohalla.
Pratyusha Banerjee, Tina Dutta, Usha Nadkarni (spoof of Balika Vadhu, Pavitra Rishta & Uttaran
Kunal Kapur (2015) - Guest appearance as Judge of Master Chef
Jackky Bhagnani & Lauren Gottlieb to promote the film Welcome to Karachi
Rajeev Mehta (2015) - Guest Appearance as Praful Parekh (Spoof of Kichidi)
Puja Banerjee (2015) - Guest Appearance
Deepika Singh - Guest Appearance
Krystle D'Souza - Guest Appearance
Hina Khan (2015) (spoof of Yeh Rishta Kya Kehlata Hai)
Kirthi Shetty (2015) - Guest Appearance
Sonali Raut (2015) - Guest Appearance
Ajaz Khan (2015) - Guest Appearance 
Upasana Singh (2015) - Guest Appearance
Malishka RJ (2015) - Guest Appearance
Sunny Deol (2015) - Guest Appearance to promote his film Ghayal Once Again
Tushar Kapoor & Aftab Shivdasani (2015) - Guest Appearance to promote their film Kya Kool Hai Hum 3
Kartik Aaryan, Sunny Singh, Nushrat Bharucha, Omkar Kapoor, Sonali Sehgall, Ishita Raj Sharma (2015) - to promote their film Pyaar Ka Punchnama 2
Yuvika Chaudhary (2015 & 2016) - Guest Appearance
Kashmera Shah, Neha Kakkar - Guest Appearance
Anita Hassanandani (2015) - Guest Appearance
Adaa Khan, Karan Wahi, Mohammad Nazim, Rahul Vaidya, Jay Soni on Republic Day (2016)
Nataliya kozhenova - Guest Appearance

References

External links
 Official Website

Indian television sketch shows
2014 Indian television series debuts
Life OK original programming
Indian television sitcoms
Indian comedy television series
Television series set in the 2010s
Television series by Optimystix Entertainment
2016 Indian television series endings